David Gurfinkel (born December 12, 1938 in Tel Aviv) is an Israeli cinematographer.

He is the father of filmmaker Jonathan Gurfinkel.

Selected filmography
The Policeman (1971)
Hagiga B'Snuker (1975)
The Magician of Lublin (1979)
The Apple (1980)
Enter the Ninja (1981)
Revenge of the Ninja (1983)
The Naked Face (1984)
The Delta Force (1986)
Over the Top (1987)
Appointment With Death (1988)
A Man Called Sarge (1990)
Cover-Up (1990)
Teenage Mutant Ninja Turtles III (1993)
The Last Patrol (2000)
Nina's Tragedies (2003)

References

External links
 
 Internet Encyclopedia of Cinematographers profile

Living people
1938 births
Israeli cinematographers